The men's half marathon at the 2016 European Athletics Championships took place on the streets of Amsterdam on 10 July. The start and finish of the race were on the Museumplein. Due to 2016 being an Olympic year the marathon is replaced by a half marathon. This is the first time that the half marathon has been run during the European Championships.

Records

Schedule

Results

Final

Individual

Team

References

Half marathon M
Half marathons